Amethi   is a city situated in the Indian state of Uttar Pradesh. Gauriganj is the administrative headquarters of the Amethi district.This district is a part of Ayodhya division in the Awadh region of the state.The history of the princely state of Amethi is more than a thousand years old. Amethi was the 72nd district of Uttar Pradesh which came into existence on 1 July 2010 by merging three tehsils of the erstwhile Sultanpur district namely Amethi, Gauriganj and Musafirkhana and two tehsils of the erstwhile Raebareli district, namely, Salon and Tiloi.  The town is part of the Amethi Lok Sabha constituency and Amethi Assembly constituency, which became reputed as a stronghold of the Indian National Congress party. The Congress leaders belonging to Nehru-Gandhi family won several elections from Amethi during 1980–2014. In 2019, Smriti Irani of Bhartiya Janta Party won this seat.

History
The history of the princely state of Amethi is more than a thousand years old.

• Raja Sodh Dev Singh established this princely state in 966 AD during the invasion of Turks. Since then, the princely state of Amethi has faced many storms but its honor and dignity remained intact. Every king of the princely state took care of it. Raja Sodh Dev ruled the princely state from 966 AD to 1007 AD. After the Turks, the Mughal rulers also attacked this princely state.

• The British also tried to merge the princely state of Amethi, in which they failed. Raja Visheshvar Baksh Singh died in 1842. After his death, the queen committed sati by taking the dead body of her husband in her arms. According to belief, even today the women of the area organize Durduria at the Sati Maharani temple on every Thursday and seek the blessings of being married.

• Raja Lal Madhav Singh ascended the throne in 1842 after Raja Visheshwar Bakhsh Singh.
After his death in 1891, Raja Bhagwan Baksh Singh became the king of Amethi. Raja Bhagwan Baksh Singh had four sons Jang Bahadur Singh, Ranveer Singh, Rananjay Singh and Shatrunjay Singh. Ranveer Singh died at a young age.

In the past, Amethi used to be called Raipur-Amethi. When the train station was built here, it took the name of Amethi, but before then there had been no settlement with that exact name. There had been a mahal or pargana of Amethi since at least the time of Akbar: it is mentioned in the Ain-i-Akbari as belonging to the sarkar of Lucknow, with a brick fort at headquarters and was held by Rajputs called "Bahmangoti"s, who are the same as the Bandhalgoti Rajputs from whom the Rajas of Amethis originated. Later on, the pargana was transferred to Manikpur.

The Rajas of Amethi
The Rajas of Amethi belongs to Suryavanshi Kachhwaha clan but later they popularly known as Bandhalgoti Rajput in Amethi region, bandhalgoti term came from name of Raja Munivar Singh (1384-1414) he was popularly known as Raja Bandhalu In future the name Raja Bandhalu became so famous that Kacchwaha rajputs later came to be known as Bandhalgoti Rajput in Amethi Region.

The Bandhalgoti Kachhwaha Rajas of Amethi originally resided at Raipur Phulwari, which along with Sarwanpur and Katra Himmat Singh, was one of the three villages that would later be amalgamated into the modern town of Raipur-Amethi. The old fort at Raipur Phulwari was destroyed by Safdar Jang c. 1743; its ruins are still visible today.

The story behind its destruction is as follows: the King of Amethi Raja Gurdatt Singh had defied Safdar Jang's authority so conspicuously that Safdar Jang personally led an army to Raipur to besiege the fort.

After a siege of 18 days, Gurdatt Singh fled into the neighbouring jungle of Ramnagar (which became the rajas' main residence), and the fort was destroyed and his estate (then known as Udiawan, until the British annexation of Awadh) put under Safdar Jang's direct control.

Raja Gurdatt Singh's son Raja Drigpal Singh was able to recover his father's estate. While Raja Gurdatt Singh had been known by various titles, all his successors beginning with Drigpal Singh were unequivocally styled Raja. Because of the prevalence of barren usar land in the pargana, there was a popular saying gar na hota Amethi úsar, Rája hota deoti dusar, meaning "if there had been no usar in Amethi, the Raja would be a second deity".

The taluqa was then divided between Drigpal Singh's two sons, with Har Chand Singh receiving the bulk of the inheritance and Jai Chand Singh founding the junior branch of Kannu Kasrawan. Har Chand Singh had originally inherited 153 villages but in 1804 was permitted to engage for the entire pargana of Amethi (except for the village of Raghipur). In 1810, this arrangement was changed by Saadat Ali Khan II, leaving Har Chand Singh with just 43 rent-free villages; he abdicated in favour of his son Dalpat Sah, who in 1813 was able to restore the taluqa to its original extent. Dalpat Sah died in 1815 and was succeeded by his son Bisheshar Singh, who then died childless in 1842.

At this point, the taluqa was inherited by Bisheshar Singh's cousin Madho Singh, whose father Arjun Singh (Dalpat's brother) had held the independent Gangoli estate as a junior branch. Under Madho Singh, these two branches became united. Madho Singh clashed with the nazim of Sultanpur, Maharaja Man Singh, in 1845; when this proved indecisive, the two parties turned to negotiations. The resulting agreement in 1846 ended up leasing the entire pargana to Madho Singh except for a few villages that would be directly retained by the nazim.

This lease included Kannu Kasrawan, still held by Jai Chand Singh's descendants, but the proprietors ignored the terms and Madho Singh ended up getting a decree of confiscation from the Nawab of Awadh himself. After protracted fighting the proprietors finally submitted in 1853.

The Udiawan taluqa was almost completely broken up upon the British annexation in 1856, but reconstituted after the 1857 uprising. Madho Singh supported the rebellion but the British were still willing to give him a sanad for the estate; they also formally acknowledged his title of Raja (he had never really sought formal recognition beforehand). Madho died in August 1891, shortly after the death of his only son, and was succeeded by a more distant relative who was adopted as his heir. At the turn of the 20th century, the Amethi estate consisted of 314 villages and 4 pattis, all in the pargana of Amethi.

Growth of the modern town
Amethi's development as a major town is because of the coming of the railway. As late as 1897, a British settlement officer wrote "Raipur is a collection of small unimportant hamlets, with positively no attempt at trade." That changed when the Oudh and Rohilkhand Railway came to town with a station in 1898. The town then rapidly grew in size and commercial importance, and as early as 1903 it was already described as "a flourishing town" and the previous description was described as "already ancient history".

As of 1901 the population was 3,688 including 1,127 Muslims which was an especially large proportion for the area. It contained the tehsil headquarters, a school, a police station, a pound, and a dispensary.

Raipur is the place where the first fort of Raja of Bandhalgoti was located. His ancestors used to reside in Raipur which is now Raipur Phulwari. It is inhabited by Ex MP Sanjaya Sinh and present MLA Garima Singh. Amethi became known worldwide with Sanjay Gandhi contesting Parliamentary Election on the behest of Raja Rannjay Singh who had close relationship with Nehru family. It is also famous for the Hanuman temple called [Hanumangarhi] and a mosque both built about hundred years ago. About 7 kilometres north of Amethi there is a tomb of famous Poet Malik Mohammad Jayasi at Magravan which is near  Ram Nagar, where he died. Present fort was built by Bandhalgoti Rajas.

Demographics

According to the 2011 census, Amethi has a population of 13,849 people, in 2,262 households. The town's sex ratio is 965 females to every 1000 males; 7,049 of Amethi's residents are male (50.9%) and 6,800 are female (49.1%). The 0-6 age group numbered 1,731, or about 12.5% of the town's population; the sex ratio for this group was 987. Members of Scheduled Castes make up 12.87% of the town's population, while no members of Scheduled Tribes were recorded. Amethi's literacy rate was 78.3% (counting only people age 7 and up); literacy was higher among men and boys (86.01%) than among women and girls (70.27%). The scheduled castes literacy rate is 60.73% (71.95% among men and boys, and 48.25% among women and girls).

In terms of employment, 21.29% of Amethi residents were classified as main workers (i.e. people employed for at least 6 months per year) in 2011. Marginal workers (i.e. people employed for less than 6 months per year) made up 6.27%, and the remaining 72.44% were non-workers. Employment status varied significantly according to gender, with 44.76% of men being either main or marginal workers, compared to only 9.74% of women.

As per the 2001 Census of India, Amethi had a population of 12,808. Males constitute 52% of the population and females 48%. Amethi has an average literacy rate of 59%, lower than the national average of 59.5%; with 59% of the males and 41% of females literate. 17% of the population is under 6 years of age.

Transport
Amethi is connected to the major cities in Uttar Pradesh and North-Eastern India via Indian Railways and roads. Amethi railway station has direct trains connecting with major cities like Jammu, Amritsar, Ambala, Delhi, Lucknow, Kanpur, Dehradun, Haridwar, Jaipur, Allahabad, Varanasi, Patna, Kolkata, Puri, Bhopal, Mumbai and Bangalore.

A number of Uttar Pradesh State Road Transport Corporation buses play from Amethi.

Allahabad Airport and Ayodhya Airport are the nearby airports from Amethi.

Institutions, industries and organisations
 Rajiv Gandhi Institute of Petroleum Technology
 HAL School Korwa 
 Shri Shiv Pratap Inter College
 Mahatma Shiv Kumar Inter College

A few public sector units were established  in Amethi in the 1970s, however not much has occurred in the town for the past two decades, leading to young people leaving in search of jobs.

Amethi has the Avionics Division of Hindustan Aeronautics Limited, the organization responsible for manufacture of Aircraft for Indian Airforce. One Ordnance Factory has been established in 2009 by Congress Government to manufacture small arms and weapons.

A joint venture between Kalashnikov Concern and the Ordnance Factory Board to establish a rifle factory in Amethi is being negotiated between India and Russia, and is planned to be launched by October 2020.

Villages
Amethi CD block has the following 86 villages:

Notable people

 Rahul Gandhi (MP)
 Rajiv Gandhi (former Prime Minister of India)
 Sanjay Gandhi (MP)
 Smriti Irani (MP and cabinet minister)
 Manoj Muntashir (lyricist)
 Rakesh Pandey (writer and author)
 Jagdish Piyush (writer, educationist, Indian National Congress politician)
 Ameeta Singh
 Deepak Singh (MLC)
 Garima Singh (MLA)
 Ravindra Pratap Singh (MP and MLA)
 Sanjaya Sinh (MP and cabinet minister)
 Babu Bhoop Singh (prominent leader in Indian Rebellion of 1857 against British)
 Babu Himmat Sah (founder ruler of Kohra)

References 

Cities and towns in Amethi district
Amethi